Lissotesta strebeli is a species of sea snail, a marine gastropod mollusk, unassigned in the superfamily Seguenzioidea.

Description
The shell grows to a height of 2.2 mm.

Distribution
This marine species occurs off the South Shetland Islands at depths between 220 m and 311 m.

References

 Engl W. (2012) Shells of Antarctica. Hackenheim: Conchbooks. 402 pp.

strebeli
Gastropods described in 1912